In the 10th edition of Systema Naturae, published in 1758, the Swedish naturalist Carl Linnaeus described 554 species of bird and gave each a binomial name.

Linnaeus had first included birds in the 6th edition of his Systema Naturae, which was published in 1748. In it he listed 260 species arranged into 51 genera, in turn divided amongst six orders. The entries for each species were very brief; rather than including a description, he gave a citation to an earlier publication — often to his own Fauna suecica, which had been published in 1746. Linnaeus generally followed the classification scheme introduced by the English parson and naturalist John Ray which grouped species based on the characteristics of each species’ bill and feet.

The 10th edition appeared in 1758 and was the first in which Linnaeus consistently used his binomial system of nomenclature. He increased the number of birds to 554 species, collectively filling 116 pages (contrasting with a mere 17 in the 6th edition). For each species he included a brief description together with one or more citations to earlier publications. He maintained 6 orders as in the 6th edition but renamed Scolopaces to Grallae. He rearranged some of the genera, dropping several and adding others to bring the total to 63.

Living in Sweden, Linnaeus did not have access to a large collection of bird specimens. In order to expand the Systema Naturae for the 10th edition, he relied on earlier publications by other authors. For many birds his description was based on George Edwards's A Natural History of Uncommon Birds which contained 210 hand-coloured plates, nearly all of which were of birds. The four volumes were published between 1743 and 1751. For many North America species Linnaeus relied on Mark Catesby's The Natural History of Carolina, Florida and the Bahama Islands which included 220 plates of birds, reptiles, amphibians, fish, insects, mammals and plants. It was published in parts between 1729 and 1747.

Linnaeus was not familiar with the species he described, which meant that his classification was often very defective. He sometimes placed very similar birds in different genera. For example, the 10th edition of Systema Naturae includes two subspecies of the common kingfisher, one of which he placed in the genus Gracula and the other in the genus Alcedo. Similarly, he included two subspecies of the red-whiskered bulbul, one of which he placed in Lanius and the other in Motacilla. In his list Linnaeus included two penguins. He placed the southern rockhopper penguin together with the red-billed tropicbird in the genus Phaethon while the African penguin he placed together with the wandering albatross in the genus Diomedea.

The International Commission on Zoological Nomenclature has selected 1 January 1758 as the "starting point" for zoological nomenclature, and stated that the 10th edition of Systema Naturae was to be treated as if published on that date. In 2016 the list of birds of the world maintained by Frank Gill and David Donsker on behalf of the International Ornithologists' Union included 448 species for which Linnaeus's description in the 10th edition is cited as the authority. Of these species, 101 have been retained in their original genus and 347 have been moved to a different genus. In addition, there are six species on Linnaeus's 1758 list that are now considered as subspecies. Of Linnaeus's 63 genera, only Tantalus and Colymbus are not now used.

In the 12th edition of his Systema Naturae published in 1766, Linnaeus described many additional birds that had not been included in the 10th edition. The 12th edition included 931 bird species divided into 6 orders and 78 genera.  The 12th edition is cited as the authority for 257 modern species of which only 25 have been retained in their original genus. There are now believed to be around 10,000 extant species.

Linnaeus described the class Aves as:
A beautiful and cheerful portion of created nature consisting of animals having a body covered with feathers and down; protracted and naked jaws (the beak), two wings formed for flight, and two feet. They are aereal, vocal, swift and light, and destitute of external ears, lips, teeth, scrotum, womb, bladder, epiglottis, corpus callosum and its arch, and diaphragm.

Linnaean Characteristics 
Heart: 2 auricles, 2 ventricles. Warm, dark red blood
Lungs: respires alternately
Jaw: incombent, naked, extended, without teeth
Eggs: covered with a calcareous shell
Organs of Sense: tongue, nostrils, eyes, and ears without auricles
Covering: incumbent, imbricate feathers
Supports: 2 feet, 2 wings; and a heart-shaped rump. Flies in the Air & Sings

In the list below, the binomial name is that used by Linnaeus.

Accipitres 

Vultur (vultures & condors)
Vultur gryphus – Andean condor 
Vultur harpyja – harpy eagle 
Vultur papa – king vulture 
Vultur aura – turkey vulture 
Vultur barbatus – bearded vulture 
Vultur percnopterus – Egyptian vulture 

Falco (falcons, eagles, & kin)
Falco melanaetus – eastern imperial eagle (now Aquila heliaca Savigny, 1809) 
Falco chrysaetos – golden eagle 
Falco fulvus – synonym of golden eagle 
Falco canadensis – golden eagle (North American subspecies) 
Falco rusticolus – gyrfalcon 
Falco barbarus – nomen dubium 
Falco caerulescens – collared falconet 
Falco albicilla – white-tailed eagle 
Falco pygargus – Montagu's harrier 
Falco milvus – red kite 
Falco forficatus – swallow-tailed kite 
Falco gentilis – northern goshawk 
Falco subbuteo – Eurasian hobby 
Falco buteo – common buzzard 
Falco tinnunculus – common kestrel 
Falco sufflator – synonym of the laughing falcon 
Falco cachinnans – laughing falcon 
Falco sparverius – American kestrel 
Falco columbarius – merlin 
Falco lanarius – perhaps a juvenile gyrfalcon 
Falco haliaetus – osprey 
Falco gyrfalco – synonym of the gyrfalcon 
Falco apivorus – European honey buzzard 
Falco aeruginosus – western marsh harrier 
Falco palumbarius – synonym of the northern goshawk 
Falco nisus – Eurasian sparrowhawk 

Strix (owls)
Strix bubo – Eurasian eagle-owl 
Strix scandiaca – snowy owl 
Strix asio – eastern screech owl 
Strix otus – long-eared owl 
Strix scops – Eurasian scops-owl 
Strix aluco – tawny owl 
Strix funerea – Boreal owl or Tengmalm's owl 
Strix nyctea - synonym of the snowy owl 
Strix stridula – synonym of the tawny owl 
Strix ulula – northern hawk-owl 
Strix passerina – Eurasian pygmy owl 

Lanius (shrikes)

Lanius cristatus – brown shrike 
Lanius excubitor – great grey shrike 
Lanius collurio – red-backed shrike 
Lanius tyrannus – eastern kingbird 
Lanius carnifex – Guianan red cotinga 
Lanius schach – long-tailed shrike 
Lanius senator – woodchat shrike 
Lanius caerulescens – white-bellied drongo 
Lanius jocosus – red-whiskered bulbul 
Lanius garrulus – Bohemian waxwing

Picae 

Psittacus (parrots)

Psittacus macao – scarlet macaw 
Psittacus ararauna – blue-and-yellow macaw 
Psittacus obscurus – nomen dubium 
Psittacus nobilis – red-shouldered macaw 
Psittacus severus – chestnut-fronted macaw 
Psittacus borneus – red lory 
Psittacus solstitialis – sun parakeet 
Psittacus carolinensis – Carolina parakeet 
Psittacus alexandri – red-breasted parakeet 
Psittacus pertinax – brown-throated parakeet 
Psittacus canicularis – orange-fronted parakeet 
Psittacus aeruginosus – subspecies of brown-throated parakeet 
Psittacus rufirostris - nomen dubium 
Psittacus ornatus – ornate lorikeet 
Psittacus agilis – black-billed amazon 
Psittacus cristatus - nomen dubium
Psittacus niger – lesser vasa parrot 
Psittacus sordidus – red-billed parrot 
Psittacus erythroleucus - nomen dubium
Psittacus erithacus – grey parrot 
Psittacus garrulus – chattering lory 
Psittacus aurorae - nomen dubium
Psittacus domicella – purple-naped lory 
Psittacus lory – black-capped lory 
Psittacus caerulocephalus - nomen dubium
Psittacus leucocephalus – Cuban amazon 
Psittacus aestivus – turquoise-fronted amazon 
Psittacus paradisi - nomen dubium 
Psittacus festivus – festive amazon 
Psittacus brasiliensis – red-tailed amazon 
Psittacus autumnalis – red-lored amazon 
Psittacus accipitrinus – red-fan parrot 
Psittacus melanocephalus – black-headed parrot 
Psittacus collarius – yellow-billed amazon 
Psittacus pullarius – red-headed lovebird 
Psittacus galgulus – blue-crowned hanging parrot 
Psittacus passerinus – green-rumped parrotlet 

Ramphastos (toucans) 

Ramphastos piperivorus – nomen dubium 
Ramphastos tucanus – white-throated toucan 
Ramphastos picatus – nomen dubium 
Ramphastos aracari – black-necked aracari 

Buceros (hornbills)

Buceros bicornis – great hornbill 
Buceros rhinoceros – rhinoceros hornbill 

Crotophaga (anis)

Crotophaga ani – smooth-billed ani 

Corvus (crows & ravens)
Corvus corax – common raven 
Corvus corone – carrion crow 
Corvus frugilegus – rook 
Corvus cornix – hooded crow 
Corvus monedula – jackdaw 
Corvus benghalensis – Indian roller 
Corvus glandarius – Eurasian jay 
Corvus cristatus – blue jay 
Corvus caryocatactes – spotted nutcracker 
Corvus pica – European magpie 
Corvus paradisi – Asian paradise-flycatcher 
Corvus infaustus – Siberian jay 

Coracias (rollers & orioles)

Coracias garrulus – European roller 
Coracias caffra - nomen dubium
Coracias oriolus – golden oriole 
Coracias galbula – Baltimore oriole 
Coracias aurea – masked bowerbird 
Coracias xanthornus – black-hooded oriole 

Gracula (mynas)
Gracula religiosa – common hill myna 
Gracula foetida – bare-necked fruitcrow 
Gracula barita – nomen dubium, possibly Carib grackle 
Gracula cristatella – crested myna 
Gracula saularis – Oriental magpie robin 
Gracula quiscula – common grackle 
Gracula atthis – common kingfisher 

Paradisaea (birds-of-paradise)

Paradisaea apoda – greater bird-of-paradise 
Paradisaea regia – king bird-of-paradise 

Cuculus (cuckoos)
Cuculus canorus – common cuckoo 
Cuculus persa – Guinea turaco 
Cuculus vetula – Jamaican lizard cuckoo 
Cuculus glandarius – great spotted cuckoo 
Cuculus scolopaceus – Asian koel 
Cuculus niger - nomen dubium
Cuculus americanus – yellow-billed cuckoo 
Cuculus auratus – northern flicker

Jynx (wrynecks)
Jynx torquilla – Eurasian wryneck

Picus (woodpeckers)
Picus martius – black woodpecker 
Picus principalis – ivory-billed woodpecker 
Picus pileatus – pileated woodpecker 
Picus hirundinaceus - nomen dubium
Picus erythrocephalus – red-headed woodpecker 
Picus carolinus – red-bellied woodpecker 
Picus viridis – European green woodpecker 
Picus benghalensis – black-rumped flameback 
Picus semirostris – a "monstrosity" 
Picus major – great spotted woodpecker 
Picus medius – middle spotted woodpecker 
Picus minor – lesser spotted woodpecker 
Picus tridactylus – Eurasian three-toed woodpecker

Sitta (nuthatches)
Sitta europaea – Eurasian nuthatch 

Alcedo (kingfishers)
Alcedo ispida – subspecies of common kingfisher 
Alcedo erithaca – Oriental dwarf kingfisher 
Alcedo alcyon – belted kingfisher 
Alcedo todus – Jamaican tody 
Alcedo smyrnensis – white-throated kingfisher 
Alcedo rudis – pied kingfisher 
Alcedo dea – paradise jacamar 

Merops (bee-eaters)
Merops apiaster – European bee-eater 
Merops viridis – blue-throated bee-eater 
Merops cinereus – nomen dubium
Merops cafer – Cape sugarbird 

Upupa (hoopoes)
Upupa epops – Eurasian hoopoe 
Upupa paradisea – nomen dubium
Upupa eremita – northern bald ibis 
Upupa pyrrhocorax – red-billed chough 

Certhia (treecreepers)
Certhia familiaris – Eurasian treecreeper 
Certhia pusilla - nomen dubium
Certhia caerulea – purple honeycreeper 
Certhia cruentata – scarlet-backed flowerpecker 
Certhia flaveola – bananaquit 

Trochilus (hummingbirds)
Trochilus paradiseus - nomen dubium
Trochilus afer - nomen dubium
Trochilus pella – crimson topaz 
Trochilus polytmus – red-billed streamertail 
Trochilus forficatus – nomen dubium
Trochilus colubris – ruby-throated hummingbird 
Trochilus ourissa - nomen dubium
Trochilus mosquitus – ruby-topaz hummingbird 
Trochilus holosericeus – green-throated carib 
Trochilus mellisugus – blue-tailed emerald 
Trochilus tomineo – nomen dubium
Trochilus surinamensis – nomen dubium
Trochilus niger – sooty barbthroat 
Trochilus mellivorus – white-necked jacobin 
Trochilus ruber – reddish hermit 
Trochilus mango – Jamaican mango 
Trochilus cristatus – Antillean crested hummingbird 
Trochilus minimus – vervain hummingbird

Anseres 

Anas (ducks, geese, & swans)
Anas cygnus – whooper swan 
Anas cygnoides – swan goose 
Anas tadorna – common shelduck 
Anas spectabilis – king eider 
Anas fusca – velvet scoter 
Anas nigra – common scoter 
Anas anser – greylag goose 
Anas erythropus – lesser white-fronted goose 
Anas canadensis – Canada goose 
Anas caerulescens – snow goose 
Anas bernicla – brant goose 
Anas mollissima – common eider 
Anas moschata – Muscovy duck 
Anas bahamensis – white-cheeked pintail 
Anas albeola – bufflehead 
Anas clypeata – northern shoveler 
Anas platyrhynchos – mallard & domestic duck 
Anas strepera – gadwall 
Anas bucephala – synonym of common goldeneye 
Anas clangula – common goldeneye 
Anas rustica – synonym of bufflehead 
Anas perspicillata – surf scoter 
Anas glaucion – synonym common goldeneye 
Anas penelope – Eurasian wigeon 
Anas acuta – northern pintail 
Anas hyemalis – long-tailed duck 
Anas ferina – common pochard 
Anas querquedula – garganey 
Anas crecca – common teal 
Anas histrionica – harlequin duck 
Anas minuta – synonym of harlequin duck 
Anas circia – synonym of garganey 
Anas autumnalis – black-bellied whistling duck 
Anas boschas – synonym of mallard & domestic duck 
Anas adunca – synonym of mallard & domestic duck 
Anas galericulata – Mandarin duck 
Anas sponsa – wood duck 
Anas arborea – West Indian whistling duck 
Anas fuligula – tufted duck 

Mergus (mergansers)
Mergus cucullatus – hooded merganser 
Mergus merganser – common merganser 
Mergus serrator – red-breasted merganser 
Mergus albellus – smew 
Mergus minutus – synonym for the smew 

Alca (auks)
Alca torda – razorbill 
Alca impennis – great auk 
Alca arctica – Atlantic puffin 
Alca lomvia – thick-billed murre 
Alca grylle – black guillemot 
Alca alle – little auk 

Procellaria (petrels)
Procellaria pelagica – European storm petrel 
Procellaria aequinoctialis – white-chinned petrel 
Procellaria capensis – Cape petrel 

Diomedea (albatrosses & penguins)
Diomedea exulans – wandering albatross 
Diomedea demersa – African penguin 

Pelecanus (pelicans & kin)
Pelecanus onocrotalus – great white pelican 
Pelecanus aquilus – Ascension frigatebird 
Pelecanus carbo – great cormorant 
Pelecanus bassanus – northern gannet 
Pelecanus piscator

Phaethon (tropicbirds)
Phaethon aethereus – red-billed tropicbird 
Phaethon demersus – southern rockhopper penguin (now Eudyptes chrysocome, (Forster, JR, 1781)) 

Colymbus (grebes & loons)
Colymbus arcticus – black-throated loon 
Colymbus cristatus – great crested grebe 
Colymbus auritus – horned grebe 
Colymbus podiceps – pied-billed grebe 

Larus (gulls)
Larus tridactylus – black-legged kittiwake 
Larus canus – common gull 
Larus marinus – great black-backed gull 
Larus fuscus – lesser black-backed gull 
Larus atricilla – laughing gull 
Larus parasiticus – parasitic jaeger 

Sterna (terns)
Sterna stolida – brown noddy 
Sterna hirundo – common tern 
Sterna nigra – black tern 

Rynchops (skimmers)
Rynchops nigra – black skimmer 
Rynchops fulva – synonym of black skimmer

Grallae 

Phoenicopterus (flamingoes)
Phoenicopterus ruber – American flamingo 

Platalea (spoonbills)
Platalea leucorodia – Eurasian spoonbill 
Platalea ajaja – roseate spoonbill 
Platalea pygmea – spoon-billed sandpiper 

Mycteria (storks)
Mycteria americana – wood stork 

Tantalus
Tantalus loculator – the "wood ibis", a synonym for the wood stork 
Ardea (herons, cranes & kin)
Ardea pavonina – black crowned crane 
Ardea virgo – demoiselle crane 
Ardea canadensis – sandhill crane 
Ardea grus – common crane 
Ardea americana – whooping crane 
Ardea antigone – sarus crane 
Ardea ciconia – white stork 
Ardea nigra – black stork 
Ardea nycticorax – black-crowned night heron 
Ardea cinerea – grey heron 
Ardea herodias – great blue heron 
Ardea violacea – yellow-crowned night heron 
Ardea caerulea – little blue heron 
Ardea striata – striated heron 
Ardea virescens – green heron 
Ardea stellaris – Eurasian bittern 
Ardea alba – great egret 
Ardea ibis – cattle egret 
Ardea aequinoctialis

Scolopax (godwits, ibises & kin)

Scolopax rubra – scarlet ibis 
Scolopax alba – American white ibis 
Scolopax fusca – synonym of American white ibis 
Scolopax totanus – common redshank 
Scolopax arquata – Eurasian curlew 
Scolopax phaeopus – whimbrel 
Scolopax rusticola – Eurasian woodcock 
Scolopax fedoa – marbled godwit 
Scolopax glottis – common greenshank (now Tringa nebularia) 
Scolopax limosa – black-tailed godwit 
Scolopax gallinago – common snipe 
Scolopax lapponica – bar-tailed godwit 
Scolopax aegocephala – synonym of bar-tailed godwit 
Scolopax haemastica – Hudsonian godwit 

Tringa (phalaropes and sandpipers)

Tringa pugnax – ruff 
Tringa vanellus – northern lapwing 
Tringa gambetta – synonym of the common redshank 
Tringa interpres – ruddy turnstone 
Tringa lobata – red-necked phalarope 
Tringa fulicaria – red phalarope 
Tringa alpina – dunlin 
Tringa ocrophus – green sandpiper 
Tringa hypoleucos – common sandpiper 
Tringa canutus – red knot 
Tringa glareola – wood sandpiper 
Tringa littorea – synonym of wood sandpiper 
Tringa squatarola – grey plover 

Charadrius (plovers)

Charadrius cristatus
Charadrius hiaticula – ringed plover 
Charadrius alexandrinus – Kentish plover 
Charadrius vociferus – killdeer 
Charadrius aegyptius – Egyptian plover 
Charadrius morinellus – Eurasian dotterel 
Charadrius apricarius – European golden plover 
Charadrius pluvialis – synonym European golden plover 
Charadrius oedicnemus – Eurasian stone-curlew 
Charadrius himantopus – black-winged stilt 
Charadrius spinosus – spur-winged lapwing 

Recurvirostra (avocets)
Recurvirostra avosetta – pied avocet 

Haematopus (oystercatchers)
Haematopus ostralegus – Eurasian oystercatcher 

Fulica (coots & kin)
Fulica atra – Eurasian coot 
Fulica chloropus – common moorhen 
Fulica porphyrio – western swamphen 
Fulica spinosa – northern jacana 

Rallus (rails)
Rallus crex – corn crake 
Rallus aquaticus – water rail 
Rallus lariformis
Rallus benghalensis – greater painted snipe 
Rallus carolinus – sora 

Psophia (trumpeters)
Psophia crepitans – grey-winged trumpeter 

Otis (bustards)
Otis tarda – great bustard 
Otis arabs – Arabian bustard 
Otis tetrax – little bustard 
Otis afra – southern black korhaan 

Struthio (ratites)
Struthio camelus – ostrich 
Struthio casuarius – southern cassowary 
Struthio americanus – greater rhea 
Struthio cucullatus – dodo

Gallinae 
Pavo (peafowl)
Pavo cristatus – Indian peafowl 
Pavo bicalcaratus – grey peacock-pheasant 

Meleagris (turkeys)
Meleagris gallopavo – wild turkey 
 Meleagris cristata
Meleagris satyra – satyr tragopan 

Crax (curassows)
Crax nigra
Crax rubra – great curassow 

Phasianus (pheasants & chickens)
Phasianus gallus – red junglefowl & domesticated chicken 
Phasianus meleagris – helmeted guineafowl 
Phasianus colchicus – common pheasant 
Phasianus pictus – golden pheasant 
Phasianus nycthemerus – silver pheasant 

Tetrao (grouse & kin)
Tetrao urogallus – western capercaillie 
Tetrao tetrix – black grouse 
Tetrao canadensis – spruce grouse 
Tetrao lagopus – willow ptarmigan 
Tetrao phasianellus – sharp-tailed grouse 
Tetrao cupido – greater prairie chicken 
Tetrao bonasia – hazel grouse 
Tetrao rufus – red-legged partridge 
Tetrao perdix – grey partridge 
Tetrao virginianus – northern bobwhite 
Tetrao marilandicus – synonym of northern bobwhite 
Tetrao orientalis – black-bellied sandgrouse 
Tetrao coturnix – common quail

Passeres 
Columba (pigeons & doves)
Columba oenas – stock dove 
Columba domestica – alternative name for the rock dove (Columba livia Gmelin JF, 1789) 
Columba gutturosa – pouter, a breed of rock dove 
Columba cucullata – Jacobin pigeon, a breed of rock dove 
Columba turbita – turbit, a breed of rock dove 
Columba tremula – broad-tailed shaker, a breed of rock dove 
Columba tabellaria – homing pigeon, a breed of rock dove 
Columba montana – ruddy quail-dove 
Columba asiatica – white-winged dove 
Columba guinea – speckled pigeon 
Columba hispanica - Roman pigeon, a breed of rock dove 
Columba palumbus – common wood pigeon 
Columba cyanocephala – blue-headed quail-dove 
Columba leucocephala – white-crowned pigeon 
Columba leucoptera - synonym white-winged dove 
Columba nicobarica – Nicobar pigeon 
Columba macroura – mourning dove 
Columba sinica - China dove, unknown and possibly extinct species 
Columba indica – emerald dove 
Columba hispida - silky feathered pigeon, a breed of rock dove 
Columba turtur – European turtle dove 
Columba risoria – Barbary dove 
Columba passerina – common ground dove 

Alauda (larks & pipits)
Alauda arvensis – Eurasian skylark 
Alauda pratensis – meadow pipit 
Alauda arborea – woodlark 
Alauda campestris – tawny pipit 
Alauda trivialis – tree pipit 
Alauda cristata – crested lark 
Alauda spinoletta – water pipit 
Alauda alpestris – shore lark 
Alauda magna – eastern meadowlark 

Sturnus (starlings)
Sturnus vulgaris – European starling 
Sturnus luteolus – synonym for the black-hooded oriole 
Sturnus contra – Asian pied starling 
Sturnus cinclus – white-throated dipper 

Turdus (thrushes & kin)
Turdus viscivorus – mistle thrush 
Turdus pilaris – fieldfare 
Turdus iliacus – redwing 
Turdus musicus – a suppressed name for the song thrush (now Turdus philomelos Brehm, 1831) 
Turdus canorus – Chinese hwamei 
Turdus rufus – brown thrasher 
Turdus polyglottos – northern mockingbird 
Turdus orpheus – subspecies of northern mockingbird 
Turdus plumbeus – red-legged thrush 
Turdus crinitus – great crested flycatcher 
Turdus roseus – rosy starling 
Turdus merula – common blackbird 
Turdus torquatus – ring ouzel 
Turdus solitarius – blue rock thrush 
Turdus arundinaceus – great reed warbler 
Turdus virens – yellow-breasted chat 

Loxia (cardinals, bullfinches & kin)
Loxia curvirostra – common crossbill 
Loxia coccothraustes – hawfinch 
Loxia enucleator – pine grosbeak 
Loxia pyrrhula – Eurasian bullfinch 
Loxia cardinalis – northern cardinal 
Loxia dominicana – red-cowled cardinal 
Loxia cristata
Loxia mexicana
Loxia eryocephala – red-headed finch (a misspelling of erythrocephala) 
Loxia flavicans
Loxia oryzivora – Java sparrow 
Loxia panicivora
Loxia punctulata – scaly-breasted munia 
Loxia hordeacea – black-winged red bishop 
Loxia sanguinirostris
Loxia astrild – common waxbill 
Loxia cyanea – suppressed name for the ultramarine grosbeak 
Loxia lineola – lined seedeater 
Loxia mexicana
Loxia chloris – European greenfinch 
Loxia butyracea
Loxia collaria
Loxia benghalensis – black-breasted weaver 
Loxia malabarica – Indian silverbill 
Loxia fusca
Loxia melanocephala – black-headed weaver 
Loxia cana
Loxia nigra – Cuban bullfinch 
Loxia caerulea – blue grosbeak 
Loxia violacea – Greater Antillean bullfinch 
Loxia minuta – ruddy-breasted seedeater 
Loxia bicolor

Emberiza (buntings)
Emberiza nivalis – snow bunting 
Emberiza calandra – corn bunting 
Emberiza hortulana – ortolan bunting 
Emberiza citrinella – yellowhammer 
Emberiza orix – southern red bishop 
Emberiza quelea – red-billed quelea 
Emberiza militaris – red-breasted blackbird 
Emberiza atrata
Emberiza familiaris
Emberiza flaveola
Emberiza psittacea
Emberiza paradisaea – long-tailed paradise whydah 
Emberiza ciris – painted bunting 
Emberiza alario – black-headed canary 

Fringilla (finches & kin)
Fringilla oryzivora – bobolink 
Fringilla coelebs – common chaffinch 
Fringilla montifringilla – brambling 
Fringilla lulensis
Fringilla lapponica – Lapland longspur 
Fringilla sylvatica
Fringilla melancholica
Fringilla erythrophthalma – eastern towhee 
Fringilla carduelis – European goldfinch 
Fringilla melba – green-winged pytilia 
Fringilla amandava – red munia 
Fringilla gyrola – bay-headed tanager 
Fringilla rubra – summer tanager 
Fringilla tristis – American goldfinch 
Fringilla zena – western spindalis 
Fringilla brasiliana
Fringilla butyracea
Fringilla canaria – canary 
Fringilla spinus – Eurasian siskin 
Fringilla flammea – common redpoll 
Fringilla flavirostris – twite 
Fringilla cannabina – linnet 
Fringilla linaria
Fringilla angolensis – blue-breasted cordon-bleu 
Fringilla violacea – violaceous euphonia 
Fringilla schoeniclus – reed bunting 
Fringilla domestica – house sparrow 
Fringilla montana – Eurasian tree sparrow 
Fringilla chinensis
Fringilla hyemalis – dark-eyed junco 
Fringilla zena – repeat of binomial name for western spindalis above 

Motacilla (wagtails)
Motacilla luscinia – thrush nightingale 
Motacilla calidris – [nomen dubium] 
Motacilla modularis – dunnock 
Motacilla schoenobaenus – sedge warbler 
Motacilla campestris – orangequit 
Motacilla curruca – lesser whitethroat 
Motacilla hippolais
Motacilla salicaria
Motacilla sylvia
Motacilla philomela
Motacilla ficedula
Motacilla alba – white wagtail 
Motacilla flava – yellow wagtail 
Motacilla tiphia – common iora 
Motacilla ruticilla – American redstart 
Motacilla hispanica – black-eared wheatear 
Motacilla oenanthe – northern wheatear 
Motacilla rubetra – whinchat 
Motacilla atricapilla – blackcap 
Motacilla emeria – subspecies of red-whiskered bulbul 
Motacilla phoenicurus – common redstart 
Motacilla erithacus
Motacilla titys – female of the common redstart 
Motacilla svecica – bluethroat 
Motacilla sialis – eastern bluebird 
Motacilla velia – opal-rumped tanager 
Motacilla spiza – green honeycreeper 
Motacilla rubecula – European robin 
Motacilla troglodytes – Eurasian wren 
Motacilla regulus – goldcrest 
Motacilla trochilus – willow warbler 
Motacilla acredula – subspecies of willow warbler 
Motacilla pendulinus – European penduline tit 
Motacilla minuta

Parus (tits & manakins)
Parus cristatus – crested tit 
Parus major – great tit 
Parus americanus – northern parula 
Parus caeruleus – blue tit 
Parus ater – coal tit 
Parus palustris – marsh tit 
Parus caudatus – long-tailed tit 
Parus biarmicus – bearded reedling 
Parus pipra – white-crowned manakin 
Parus erythrocephalus – golden-headed manakin 
Parus aureola – crimson-hooded manakin 
Parus cela – yellow-rumped cacique 

Hirundo (swallows & swifts)
Hirundo rustica – barn swallow 
Hirundo esculenta – glossy swiftlet 
Hirundo urbica – common house martin 
Hirundo riparia – sand martin 
Hirundo apus – common swift 
Hirundo subis – purple martin 
Hirundo pelagica – chimney swift 
Hirundo melba – alpine swift 

Caprimulgus (nightjars)
Caprimulgus europaeus – European nightjar 
Caprimulgus americanus – Jamaican pauraque

Notes

References

Sources

Systema Naturae
 Systema Naturae, Aves